Flabellaria is a genus in the Malpighiaceae, a family of about 75 genera of flowering plants in the order Malpighiales. Flabellaria includes one variable species, Flabellaria paniculata.

Etymology
The genus name Flabellaria comes from the Latin word flabellum meaning small fan, referring to the shape of the samara.

Synonyms
 Triaspis flabellaria A.Juss.
 Triopterys pinnata Poir.

Fossil record
This genus is known in the fossil record from the Cretaceous to the Eocene (age range: from 70.6 to 33.9 million years ago.).

Description
These plants are woody vine, with paniculate, lateral and terminal inflorescences up to 20 cm. long. Flowers are radially symmetrical, about 1 centimeter in diameter, with white and spatulate petals.

Distribution and habitat

Bibliography
 Abo, K.A., Olugbuyiro, J.A.O. (2004) Phytochemical and antibacterial studies of extracts of Flabellaria paniculata. African Journal of Biomedical Research  7(1):35-36.
 Abo, K.A., Olugbuyiro, J.A.O., Famakinde, S.A. (2004) Anti-infective and wound healing properties of Flabellaria paniculata 1.  African journal of Biomedical Research 7 (2): 85–87. 
 Olugbuyiro, J.A.O., Abo, K.A., Leigh, O.O. (2010) Wound healing effect Of Flabellaria paniculata leaf extracts Journal of Ethnopharmacology 127: 786–788.
 ORSTOM 1988. List Vasc. Pl. Gabon

References

Malpighiaceae
Malpighiaceae genera
Monotypic Malpighiales genera
Taxa named by Antonio José Cavanilles